In 1949 the Postal Telegraph and Telephone (Switzerland) ordered 214 MOWAG local company cars   (German Ortsdienstwagen). The vehicles had a right steering and space for a passenger. From the cab you can get into the cargohold, The cargohold can be left on both sides by sliding doors. The body is made with tapered pins and secured with 4 screws and can be removed easily with the help of Hissösen, the car was very easy to maintain so that the PTT own vehicle maintenance companies could change with little effort within 3 hours the engine and transmission.

References 

  Ruedi Baumann: „Alles“ was MOWAG schon bewegt hat - Auf Umwegen zum Welterfolg.   German only, SwissMoto. Bildpress Zuerich BPZ

Swiss brands
Vans
Vehicles of Switzerland